Chioninia delalandii (English: Delalande's skink) is a species of skink, a lizard in  the family Scincidae. The species is endemic to the Cape Verde Islands.

Etymology
The species is named after French naturalist Pierre Antoine Delalande.

References

Further reading
Boulenger GA (1887). Catalogue of the Lizards in the British Museum (Natural History). Second Edition. Volume III. ... Scincidæ ... London: Trustees of the British Museum (Natural History). (Taylor and Francis, printers). xii + 575 pp. + Plates I-XL. (Mabuia delalandii, pp. 158–159).
Mausfeld, Patrick; Schmitz, Andreas; Böhme, Wolfgang; Misof, Bernhard; Vrcibradic, Davor; Rocha, Carlos Frederico Duarte (2002). "Phylogenetic Affinities of Mabuya atlantica Schmidt, 1945, Endemic to the Atlantic Ocean Archipelago of Fernando de Noronha (Brazil): Necessity of Partitioning the genus Mabuya Fitzinger, 1826 (Scincidae: Lygosominae)". Zoologischer Anzeiger 241: 281–293. (Chioninia delalandii, new combination).

delalandii
Endemic vertebrates of Cape Verde
Reptiles described in 1839
Taxa named by André Marie Constant Duméril
Taxa named by Gabriel Bibron